Twyla Lorraine Ring (née Holznagel; September 15, 1937 – May 27, 2022) was an American politician in the state of Minnesota. She served in the Minnesota State Senate from 1999 to 2002 and was a Democrat. Ring was born in Minneapolis, Minnesota and graduated from North Community High School, in Minneapolis, in 1955. Ring lived with her husband and family in North Branch, Minnesota and was a newspaper journalist and editor for the ECM Post Review. She also served on the North Branch School Board from 1978 to 1984.

References

1937 births
2022 deaths
Editors of Minnesota newspapers
Politicians from Minneapolis
People from North Branch, Minnesota
Women state legislators in Minnesota
School board members in Minnesota
Democratic Party Minnesota state senators
21st-century American women